Montecristo is a town and municipality located in the Bolívar Department, northern Colombia.

Climate
Montecristo has a very wet tropical monsoon climate (Am) with very heavy rainfall from April to November and moderate to heavy rainfall from December to March.

References

Municipalities of Bolívar Department